The Bastard Country is a 1959 Australian play by Anthony Coburn. It was also known as Fire on the Wind.

It was performed by the Australian Elizabethan Theatre Trust. Grant Taylor played the key role.

It was adapted for radio in 1960.

Plot
John Willy is a violent man who owns a farm in northern Victoria and has a mistress, Connie. He is visited by Greek Nick Diargos, who intends to kill John raping and murdering Nick's wife in Greece with John was a soldier.

However he falls for John's daughter Mary.

Original cast
Neva Carr Glyn  as Connie Naismith
Patricia Conolly as May Willy
Neil Fitzpatrick as Possum Willy
Ron Haddrick as Doctor Gorman
Rodney Milgate as Billy Willy
Desmond Rolfe as Jim Richards
Grant Taylor as Nick Diargos
Frank Waters as John Willy

Reception
The Sydney Tribune said the 1959 production featured "one of the finest performances that this reviewer has seen on the Elizabethan stage— that of Grant Taylor's portrayal of Nick Diargos, the. vengeance-seeking Greek. He invests Diargos with an awe-inspiring strength and yet with gentleness and dignity and his performance is one of the main reasons for the play's great impact on the audience."

References

External links
Production details at AusStage
Play information at AustLit
Original program at the Trust

1959 plays
1950s Australian plays